WISA may refer to:

 WISA (1390 AM) is a radio station broadcasting a Spanish News/Talk format. 
 WISA web solution stack, which consists of Windows Server, Internet Information Services, Microsoft SQL Server and ASP.NET
 Welsh Ice Skating Association
 West Indies Associated States
 Western India States Agency
 WiSA, Wireless Speaker and Audio Association
What If Scenario Analysis - in Project Management